The 2009–10 Surinamese League (known officially as the Hoofdklasse) season was the 76th season of the Surinamese Hoofdklasse, the highest football league competition of Suriname.

Teams 
Excelsior, Super Red Eagles and Takdier Boys were relegated to the Eerste Klasse 2009-10 after finishing the 2008-2009 season in the bottom three places.Takdier Boys suffered their first relegation in Hoofdklasse.Super Red Eagles and Excelsior complete the list of relegated League

The three teams relegated were replaced by the champion of the Eerste Klasse Jai Hanuman, runner-up The Brothers that he acquired the accessed via the play-offs for promotion to win the Excelsior.

Stadiums and locations 

The following 10 clubs competed in the Hoofdklasse during the 2009-10 season.

Regular season

Competition table

Results

Season statistics

Top scorers

The least passed goalkeepers

Awards

References

External links 
 SVB Website
 Results

SVB Eerste Divisie seasons
1
Surinam